William Mundell may refer to:
 William D. Mundell (1912–1997), American poet
 William Richard Mundell, British colonel
 Bill Mundell, American politician

Human name disambiguation pages